Kim Jae-sung (born 3 October 1983) is a South Korean professional footballer who plays for Udon Thani.

Kim previously played for Bucheon SK and Jeju United.

Kim graduated from the same Football Academy College as Park Ji-sung. He has said that he used to train with Ji Sung Park as a teenager at the college.

He has also had recent international duty call backs and was influential in the 3–1 victory over Japan in the 2010 East Asian Football Championship.

On 9 January 2010, Kim made his first international cap for South Korea at the friendly match against Zambia.

Club career statistics

International career statistics

International goals

Honors

Club
Pohang Steelers
Korean FA Cup: 2008
Korean League Cup: 2009
AFC Champions League: 2009

References

External links
 
 

1983 births
Living people
South Korean footballers
South Korean expatriate footballers
Association football midfielders
South Korea international footballers
Jeju United FC players
Pohang Steelers players
Seoul E-Land FC players
Adelaide United FC players
Kim Jae-sung
K League 2 players
K League 1 players
2010 FIFA World Cup players
Ajou University alumni
A-League Men players
Expatriate soccer players in Australia
South Korean expatriate sportspeople in Australia